The Standing Joint Committee on the Library of Parliament (BILI) is a joint standing committee of the House of Commons and Senate of Canada. Its mandate is to advise the Speakers of the House and Senate in the direction of the Library of Parliament. This mandate is set out in Standing Orders 108 and 111 of the House and Rules 86 and 90 of the Senate.

Studies
The effectiveness, management and operation of the Library of Parliament
The appointment of the Parliamentary Librarian, the Associate Parliamentary Librarian, and their officers and staff

Membership

Senate

House of Commons

External links
 

Library